General elections were held in Singapore on 10 April 1951 to elect members to nine seats in the Legislative Council, up from six seats in the 1948 elections. A 32-day-long campaign period was scheduled, with nomination day on 8 March 1951. The result was a victory for the Progressive Party, which won six of the nine seats.

Electoral system
The Legislative Council was increased from 22 to 25 members, with the number of elected seats increased from six to nine. Three seats were nominated by the three commercial organisations (the Singapore Chamber of Commerce, Chinese Chamber of Commerce and Indian Chamber of Commerce), whilst the British colonial government appointed the remaining 13 seats, which were given to the Governor, Colonial Secretary, Financial Secretary, Attorney-General, Solicitor-General, two Directors, two ex officio Commissioners and four non-officio ones. One of the four non-officio members, only one woman was appointed, war heroine Elizabeth Choy, who ran unsuccessfully in the 1950 Municipal Commission elections.

The British government approved the suggestion by political parties to create six constituencies within the city according to municipal districts, including Balestier (North), Keppel (South), Katong (East) and Tanglin (West), while the rural area was divided into three instead of two. The joint districts were scrapped. Voting was again not compulsory and the franchise restricted.

Campaign
The Progressive Party's main political opponent at the municipal level, the Labour Party, entered the legislative fray. Well-known Malay politician Mansoor bin Adabi, husband of Maria Bertha Hertogh (also known as Natra binte Maarof), the young Dutch woman whose parentage controversy sparked a racial riot in Singapore the previous year, planned to contest Bukit Timah under the PP banner but withdrew his nomination at the final minute for unknown reasons. The campaign manager for PP vice-chairman John Laycock was Lee Kuan Yew, a legal assistant in the former's law firm who would form the People's Action Party in 1954.

Out of 48,155 registered voters, only 52% voted. There had been boycott calls and the city was still suffering from the after-effects of the Maria Hertogh riots four months before the elections.

The elections saw the first electoral contest for the reserved seat for the Indian Chamber of Commerce.

Results
Voter turnout was significantly lower than in the previous elections of 1948, falling to 52.05%, 11 percentage points lower than the 1948 elections. Voter turnout was highest in Seletar at 69% while City saw the lowest voter turnout at just 44%, while three other constituencies also had turnouts lower than 50%, the first time in Singapore's electoral history that voter turnout had been below 50%.

Vilasini Menon became the first woman elected to the Legislative Council, winning the Seletar constituency as an independent. Progressive Party leader Tan Chye Cheng was the best performing candidate, receiving 80% of the vote in Tanglin while independent candidate Mizra Abdul Majid was the worst performing candidate by polling just 4% in City and being the only candidate to lose their $500 deposit. In absolute numbers, Labour Party leader Lim Yew Hock received the highest number of votes (2,369) in Keppel while Labour Party candidate Thomas Davies Richards of Tanglin was the worst performing candidate with just 351 votes.

In terms of vote margin, the Labour Party's candidate Caralapati Raghaviah Dasaratha Raj won with the narrowest margin of 6.56% while PP leader Tan Chye Cheng won with the biggest margin of 60.27%.

By winning six of the nine constituency seats, the Progressive Party became the first and only party to win a two-thirds majority prior to 1959 and the only party other than the People's Action Party to do so.

By constituency

See also
List of Singaporean electoral divisions (1951–55)

References

General elections in Singapore
British rule in Singapore
Singapore
1951 in Singapore